Pope John Paul II created 231 cardinals in nine consistories held at roughly three-year intervals. Three of those cardinals were first created in pectore, that is, without their names being announced, and only identified by the pope later. He named a fourth in pectore as well but never revealed that name. At his 2001 consistory, where he elevated 42 prelates and announced the names of two created in pectore earlier, he created more cardinals at one time than ever before or since. His consistories in 1985, 1994, and 2003 were among the largest ever.

In his first three consistories, John Paul adhered to the limit of 120 that Pope Paul VI set on the number of cardinal electors in 1975. and he included that maximum when he reformed the papal conclave procedures in 1996. His appointments exceeded that number for the first time in 1988 when the number of electors rose to 121, and then again in 1998 when it reached 122. In each of his last two consistories, in 2001 and 2003, he raised the number to 135, a record figure never surpassed by his predecessors or successors.

He was the first pope to allow someone not a bishop to become a cardinal since Pope John XXIII mandated that cardinals be bishops in 1962. His appointments included one future pope, Pope Francis.

30 June 1979

John Paul created fourteen cardinals at his first consistory and he announced he was withholding the name of a fifteenth. That additional cardinal's name was not made public until 1991. All those named were archbishops, including six Italians and two Poles. These appointments, excluding the name withheld, brought the number of cardinals who had not passed their 80th birthday to 120, the maximum set by Pope Paul VI, while the entire membership of the College of Cardinals reached 135.

Cardinal "in pectore"

2 February 1983

John Paul created 18 cardinals on 2 February 1983, including the first resident of the Soviet Union (Vaivods of Latvia) and four others from countries with Communist governments. This brought the College to 138 members, of whom 120 were young enough to serve as electors in a papal conclave. Another cardinal was created in pectore or secretly. John Paul granted a dispensation from the requirement that all cardinals be bishops to Henri de Lubac, the first such dispensation since Pope John XXIII established the rule in 1962.

25 May 1985

John Paul created 28 cardinals on 25 May 1985 in a ceremony held outdoors for the first time in St. Peter's Square. They included the first from Ethiopia and Nicaragua and an archbishop of the Ukrainian Rite. It raised the College's membership to 152, with 120 eligible to vote for a new pope.

28 June 1988

 
On 29 May 1988 John Paul announced he would create 25 new cardinals in 28 June, though the death of Hans Urs von Balthasar of Switzerland reduced that number to 24. This consistory took the number of cardinal electors from 97 to 121, which fell within a month to the maximum of 120, a majority of them appointed by John Paul. It brought the total number of cardinals to a new high of 160, of whom John Paul named 84.

28 June 1991

On 29 May 1991, John Paul announced he would create 22 cardinals at a consistory on 28 June and revealed the name of one he had created in pectore in 1979, Ignatius Kung Pin-mei. This increased the number of cardinal electors to 120 from 100. It also raised to 13 the number cardinals from the Soviet Union and nations of the recently dissolved Warsaw Pact. The total number of cardinals reached 162 after the consistory.

26 November 1994
On 30 October 1994, John Paul announced the names of 30 new cardinals from 24 countries, scheduling the consistory for 26 November. He said others were deserving but he "thought it appropriate to adhere to the limit set by my Predecessor Paul VI". The total number of cardinals reached 167 after the consistory.

21 February 1998

John Paul announced on 18 January 1998 that he would create 22 new cardinals, but withheld the names of two of them. He had also planned to include Josip Uhač, a Vatican diplomat and curial official who died that morning. The consistory was scheduled for 21 February. Excluding the two not named, this brought the membership of the College of Cardinals to 165, of whom  122 were eligible to vote in a conclave.

Cardinal created "in pectore"

21 February 2001

On 21 January 2001, Pope John Paul II announced plans to raise 37 prelates to the rank on cardinal at a consistory in February. He also said that at the consistory he would announce the names of two cardinals he named in pectore in 1998. He followed that by announcing the names of five more on 28 January and revealed the two made cardinals secretly in 1998, Marian Jaworski and Janis Pujats. The 44 cardinals created at this consistory was the largest ever created at a consistory. It increased the number of cardinals eligible to vote in a papal election to 135, despite the maximum of 120 set by Pope Paul VI in 1975 and reiterated by John Paul II in 1996; he said in each of his announcements that he was setting aside this limit. The total number of cardinals reached 183 after the consistory.

21 October 2003

Pope John Paul II announced on 28 September 2003 that he would create 31 new cardinals in an October consistory, but withheld the name of one of them, apparently a resident of a country where Catholicism was the object of government persecution. Twenty-six of those publicly named were young enough to vote in a papal conclave, and seven of those were members of the Roman Curia. This consistory increased the number of cardinal electors from 109 to 135. The total number of cardinals reached 194 after the consistory. Because the withheld name was never published, that cardinal's appointment expired when the Pope died.

Demographic adjustment 
In 2004, the birth year of Cardinal Henryk Gulbinowicz, long reported as 1928, was corrected to 1923. The adjustment meant he was past his 80th birthday and no longer counted as a cardinal elector. In 1942, as a young man, Gulbinowicz had falsified his birth records to escape being sent to a Nazi labor camp. The correct birth date was reported in the Italian press as early as March 2004 and printed in the Pontifical Yearbook presented to John Paul on 31 January 2005.

See also
 List of current cardinals

Notes

References

See also

John Paul II
Pope John Paul II-related lists
20th-century Catholicism
21st-century Catholicism
College of Cardinals